Aqajan may refer to:
 Aqajan, East Azerbaijan
 Aqajan-e Tavakkol, Fars Province
 Aqajan, Lorestan